Radomir Konstantinović (1928−2011) was Serbian writer and philosopher. His most famous work is a philosophical treatise "Filosofija palanke" (The small town philosophy). He won the prestigious literary NIN Award in 1960 for the novel "Izlazak" (Exodus).

Biography

Konstantinović was born on 27 March 1928 in Subotica. He started his literary career as a poet. He published a book of poetry "Kuća bez krova" (House without a roof) in 1951, but then switched to writing novels and wrote a whole series of experimental novels. His novel "Izlazak" (Exodus) won him the 1960 NIN Award for the best novel of the year. Radomir Konstantinović award is awarded every two years in his honour.

Literary works
“Kuća bez krova” (House without a roof) — 1951, poetry book
"Daj nam danas" (Give us today) — 1954, novel
"Mišolovka" (Mouse trap) — 1956, novel
"Čisti i prljavi" (The dirty and the clean) — 1958, novel
"Izlazak" (Exodus) — 1960, novel
"Ahasfer ili traktat o pivskoj flaši" (Ahafser or the treatise on the beer bottle) — 1964, novel
"Pentagram" — 1966, book of essays
"Filosofija palanke" (Small town philosophy) — 1969, philosophical treatise
"Biće i jezik" I-VIII (Being and language) — 1983
"Dekartova smrt" (The death of Descartes) — 1996
"Beket prijatelj" (Beckett friend) — 2000, collection of letters Samuel Beckett sent to Konstantinović

References

Sources

External links
Special issue of Danas dedicated to Konstantinović, 5−6 November 2011 

20th-century Serbian philosophers
Serbian political philosophers
1928 births
2011 deaths
Writers from Subotica
Serbian novelists
20th-century Serbian novelists